Dame Marguerite Pindling, Lady Pindling,  ( McKenzie; born 26 June 1932) served as the tenth governor-general of the Bahamas, from 8 July 2014 to 28 June 2019. She is the second female governor-general of the Bahamas after Dame Ivy Dumont.

She was married to Sir Lynden Pindling, the first Prime Minister of The Bahamas. The couple had 4 children.

Biography 
Marguerite McKenzie was born to Reuben and Viola McKenzie in South Andros on 26 June 1932. She moved to Nassau in 1946 to live with her sister and attended the Western Senior School. She later became an assistant to photographer Stanley Toogood. Soon after, she met Lynden Pindling, who would go on to be the first black Premier of the colony of the Bahama Islands (second Premier to Sir Roland Symonette) from 1967 to 1969, then the first and longest serving Prime Minister of the Bahamas from 1969 to 1992. The couple married on 5 May 1956 and remained married until his death on 26 August 2000.  The couple had four children. Obafemi Pindling, Leslie Pindling, Monique Johnson, and Michelle Sands.

She was appointed Dame Grand Cross of the Order of St Michael and St George in 2014.

References 

1932 births
Dames Grand Cross of the Order of St Michael and St George
Governors-General of the Bahamas
Living people
People from Nassau, Bahamas
People from South Andros
Spouses of prime ministers of the Bahamas
21st-century Bahamian women politicians
21st-century Bahamian politicians
Wives of knights